Ghatal subdivision is an administrative subdivision of Paschim Medinipur district in the state of West Bengal, India.

Subdivisions
Paschim Medinipur district is divided into the following administrative subdivisions, after separation of Jhargram subdivision from the district in 2017:

Ghatal subdivision has a density of population of 1,099 per km2. 21.93% of the total population of the district resides in this subdivision.

Administrative units
Ghatal subdivision has  3 police stations, 5 community development blocks, 5 panchayat samitis, 48 gram panchayats, 656 mouzas, 630 inhabited villages and 5 municipalities. The municipalities are: Chandrakona, Khirpai, Ramjibanpur, Ghatal and Kharar.  The subdivision has its headquarters at Ghatal.

Police stations
Police stations in Ghatal subdivision have the following features and jurisdiction:

Gram panchayats
The subdivision contains 48 gram panchayats under 5 community development blocks:

 Chandrakona I block: Jara, Mangrul, Monoharpur–I, Lakshmipur, Manikkundu and Monoharpur–II.
 Chandrakona II block:  Bandipur–I, Basanchora, Bhagabantapur–II, Bandipur–II, Bhagabantapur–I and Kuapur.
 Daspur I block: Basudevpur, Nandanpur–I, Panchberia, Sarberia–II, Daspur–I, Nandanpur–II, Rajnagar, Daspur–II, Niz  Narajol and Sarberia–I.
 Daspur II block: Benai, Goura, Kheput Dakshnibarh, Ranichak, Chaipat, Jyotghanashyam, Khukurdaha, Sahachak, Dudhkomra, Kamalpur, Nishchintapur, Gochhati, Khanjapur and Palashpai.
 Ghatal block: Ajabnagar–I, Dewanchak–I, Mansuka–I, Monoharpur–I, Ajabnagar–II, Dewanchak–II, Mansuka–II, Monoharpur–II, Beersingha, Irhpala, Mohanpur and Sultanpur.

Blocks
Community development blocks in Ghatal subdivision are:

Education
Paschim Medinipur district had a literacy rate of 78.00%  as per the provisional figures of the census of India 2011. Medinipur Sadar subdivision had a literacy rate of 76.23%, Kharagpur subdivision 80.51% and Ghatal subdivision 82.55%.  

Given in the table below (data in numbers) is a subdivision-wise comprehensive picture of the education scenario in Paschim Medinipur district, after separation of Jhargram subdivision, for the year 2013-14.

Note: Primary schools include junior basic schools; middle schools, high schools and higher secondary schools include madrasahs; technical schools include junior technical schools, junior government polytechnics, industrial technical institutes, industrial training centres, nursing training institutes etc.; technical and professional colleges include engineering colleges, medical colleges, para-medical institutes, management colleges, teachers training and nursing training colleges, law colleges, art colleges, music colleges etc. Special and non-formal education centres include sishu siksha kendras, madhyamik siksha kendras, adult high schools, centres of Rabindra mukta vidyalaya, recognised Sanskrit tols, institutions for the blind and other handicapped persons, Anganwadi centres, reformatory schools etc.

The following institutions are located in Ghatal subdivision:

 Chandrakona Vidyasagar Mahavidyalaya at Chandrakona was established in 1985.
 Institute of Science and Technology at Dhurbila, Dhamkuria, Chandrakona, near Prayag Film City, a private engineering and management college, was established in 2006.
 Narajole Raj College at Narajole was established in 1966.
 Chaipat Saheed Pradyot Bhattacharya Mahavidyalaya at Chaipat was established in 2007.
Ghatal Government Polytechnic

Healthcare
The table below (all data in numbers) presents an overview of the subdivision-wise medical facilities available and patients treated, after the separation of Jhargram, in the hospitals, health centres and sub-centres in 2014 in Paschim Medinipur district.  
 

Excluding nursing homes

Medical facilities
Medical facilities in the Ghatal subdivision are as follows:

Hospitals: (Name, location, beds) 
Ghatal Subdivisional Hospital, Ghatal (M), 200 beds

Rural hospitals: (Name, CD block, location, beds) 
Khirpai Rural Hospital, Chandrakona I CD block, Khirpai, 30 beds
Chandrakona Rural Hospital, Chandrakona II CD block, Chandrakona, 60 beds
Daspur Rural Hospital, Daspur I CD block, Daspur, 30 beds
Sonakhali Rural Hospital, Daspur II CD block, Sonakhali, 30 beds

Block primary health centres: (Name, CD block, location, beds)
Viidyasagar Block Primary Health Centre, Ghatal CD block, Birsingha, 10 beds

Primary health centres : (CD block-wise)(CD block, PHC location, beds)
Chandrakona I CD block: Ramjibanpur (10), Ramkrishnapur (PO Tatarpara) (10),  Mangrul (PO Goaldanga Mangrul) (10), Dingal (PO Dingal-Kumargeria) (10), Jara (2)
Chandrrakona II CD block: Basanchora (PO Chhatraganj) (10), Bhagabantapur (4), 
Ghatal CD block: Khasbarh (6), Natuk (10), 
Daspur I: Makrampur (PO Choto Makrampur) (4), Narajole (10), Sekenday (2)
Daspur II: Khukurda (10),  Nischintapur (6), Chaipat (6)

Electoral constituencies
Lok Sabha (parliamentary) and Vidhan Sabha (state assembly) constituencies in Paschim Medinipur district were as follows from 2006:

References

Subdivisions of West Bengal
Subdivisions in Paschim Medinipur district
Paschim Medinipur district